Dexron is the trade name for a group of technical specifications of automatic transmission fluid (ATF) created by General Motors (GM). The name is a registered trademark (later becoming a brand) of GM, which licenses the name and specifications to companies which manufacture the fluid and sell it under their own brand names. Not all Dexron fluids are licensed for reselling under another brand name. All licensed Dexron fluids must have a license number that begins with the letters B through J. If no license number or "Dexron Approved" logo is found on the container, the fluid may not be GM approved and the fluid cannot be guaranteed to meet GM specifications. Like many automobile manufacturers, GM uses transmissions sourced from other suppliers or transmission manufacturers around the world. These transmissions are not manufactured by GM. Many of these automatic transmissions use unique fluids that might not be shown on this page.

Originally the 'Dexron' name was associated exclusively with automatic transmission fluids, later GM released Dexron gear oils and other lubricants under the Dexron brand.

GM Automatic Transmission Fluids (ATF)
The original Dexron (B) transmission fluid was introduced on April 1, 1967. Over the years, the original Dexron (B) was supplanted by Dexron-II(C), Dexron-II(D), Dexron-II(E), Dexron-III(F), Dexron-III(G), Dexron-III(H), Dexron-VI(J), Dexron HP, Dexron LV ATF HP, and Dexron ULV which is the latest fluid. GM has upgraded the Dexron specifications over time. The newer fluids are not always backward compatible with previous fluids. Newer 6, 8, 9, and 10-speed transmissions as well as Plug-In Hybrid (PHEV), and Electric Vehicle (EV) transmission technologies require specialized fluids to operate properly. There remains a market for older fluids that claim to meet the earlier fluid specifications. See the details below for backward compatibility of each fluid.

Before Dexron: 1937–1967

1937 – Motor Oil

The Automatic Safety Transmission was first offered as an extra cost option by the Oldsmobile Division of GM in the fall of 1937 for their Six and Eight models. It was only used during the 1938 and 1939 model years. The Automatic Safety Transmission used the same seasonal grade of motor oil as the engine for lubrication and hydraulic functions.

The Automatic Safety Transmission was a 4-speed transmission providing full-power shifting without the need for a conventional clutch. The transmission was called the Automatic Safety Transmission (AST) because the clutch operation was reduced to one-third of that required by a conventional transmission. The clutch was only necessary when starting or stopping the car.

The AST had two driving ranges (Low and High). In low range, the transmission would shift from 1st to 2nd gear and then hold in 2nd. In High range, the transmission would start in 1st gear, jump to 3rd, then shift to 4th gear. The driver could change ranges with a flick of a finger.

1939 – Hydra-Matic Drive "Fluid"
Released in 1939, the 1940–1949 GM Hydra-Matic Drive was used by the Oldsmobile, Cadillac, and Pontiac divisions. The Hydra-Matic Drive used a specialized lubricant called GM Transmission Fluid No. 1. By using the term "Fluid" rather than "Oil" they hoped to discourage the previously accepted practice of using S.A.E 20 engine oil. This fluid was composed of a Group 1 base oil and additives to reduce oxidation, foaming, rust, corrosion, varnish, and sludge build-up. This was the world's first automatic transmission fluid designed for the world's first mass-produced automatic transmission.

This fluid had cold weather performance problems which led to the need for an improved fluid; the Type "A" fluid in 1949. The Hydra-Matic drive fluid was only available at GM dealerships. As a result, regular S.A.E. 20 engine oil was being used in its place at filling stations and repair garages. Engine oil was only approved as a temporary fill fluid and led to transmission problems.

1949 – Type "A" Fluid

In 1949, General Motors (GM) established an Automatic Transmission Fluid (ATF) Committee (GM ATF Committee). The GM ATF committee established fluid specifications and a qualification procedure to eliminate the unsatisfactory fluids and at the same time provide the car owner with a means of identifying qualified fluids. The GM ATF Committee released a new Type "A" fluid specification. GM partnered with the Armour Research Foundation for fluid and qualification testing. Fluids that met the GM qualification requirements were issued an Armour Qualification (AQ) license number of AQ-ATF-xxx. Example (AQ-ATF-101). The license number had to be displayed on the fluid container. As a result, qualified GM automatic transmission fluid was made available at retailers and service garages everywhere.

From 1949 to 1951 there were only two licensed fluids: 
 GM Type "A" Automatic Transmission fluid License No. AQ-ATF-101 
 Texaco Texamatic Fluid Type "A" License No. AQ-ATF-102.

This was the first GM automatic transmission fluid that was made available for sale at retailers besides GM dealerships. In 1951, GM began licensing more Type "A" fluids, this led to several hundred brands of licensed Type "A" fluid on the market. This fluid is backward compatible with the Hydra-Matic Drive fluid produced from 1940 to 1949.

It is important to understand that every automatic transmission produced by any vehicle manufacturer (Oldsmobile, Cadillac, Buick, Chevrolet, Pontiac, GMC, Ford, Mercury, Lincoln, Chrysler, Dodge, Desoto, Packard, and Studebaker) used motor oil or the GM Type "A" transmission fluids from 1949 to 1958.

In 1950 Ford released their 1951 Fordomatic 3-speed transmission; it used the GM Type "A" fluid. In 1952 Chrysler released their 1953 Powerflite 2-speed transmission; it also used the GM Type "A" fluid.

This fluid was first used in the following transmissions:
 1948 Buick Dynaflow 2-Speed Semi-Automatic Transmission
 1950 Chevrolet Cast Iron Powerglide 2-Speed Semi-Automatic Transmission
 1953 GM Dual Range Hydra-Matic 4-Speed Automatic Transmission
 1953 Chevrolet Powerglide 2-Speed Automatic Transmission
 1953 Buick Dynaflow 2-Speed Automatic Transmission
 1956 Buick Dynaflow 2-Speed Automatic Transmission
 1956 GM Controlled Coupling Hydra-Matic 4-Speed Automatic Transmission
 1957 Chevrolet Turboglide 3-Ratio Automatic Transmission
 1957 Buick Flightpitch Dynaflow 3-Ratio Automatic Transmission

1957 – Type "A" Suffix "A" Fluid

In 1957, GM released a new Type "A" Suffix "A" fluid specification. This fluid was better suited for the higher fluid temperatures caused by the unique torque converters and higher power engines of the day. The fluid specification was revised again in 1958, 1959, and 1960. GM continued the licensing program allowing oil companies to produce the new Type "A" Suffix "A" fluid under their own brand name. GM Licensed fluids had the Armour Qualification license number of AQ-ATF-xxxA. Example (AQ-ATF-752A) stamped on the can. This fluid is backward compatible with the Type "A" and Hydra-Matic Drive fluids produced from 1940 to 1957.

In 1959, Ford released their own automatic transmission fluid specification (M2C33-A) and stopped using GM fluid specifications. Also in 1959, Toyota released their Toyoglide 2-speed transmission; it used the GM Type "A" Suffix "A" fluid.

This fluid was first used in the following transmissions:
 1961 GM Roto-Hydra-Matic 3-Speed Automatic Transmission
 1961 Buick Dual Path 2-Speed Automatic Transmission
 1962 Chevrolet Aluminum Powerglide 2-Speed Automatic Transmission
 1964 GM Hydra-Matic 400 3-Speed Automatic Transmission
 1966 GM Hydra-Matic 425 3-Speed Automatic Transmission

Dexron fluids

1967 – Dexron(B)

Released April 1, 1967. The original Dexron (B) fluid better retained the initial properties of the previous Type "A" Suffix "A" fluid (Several thousand cycles compared to 1000 cycles). Dexron (B) was composed of a more stable, less reactive, hydrotreated Group 1 base oil plus additives to help prevent foaming, oxidation, and damage from elevated temperatures. This was the first GM ATF to advertise 24,000 miles between changes.

This was the first GM ATF to require red dye as an aid in fluid leak detection. Prior to this fluid, GM ATF was the same color as engine oil. Aftermarket ATF was available with red dye.

GM Dexron (B) licensed products have a license number on the container that begins with the letter B. Example: B10001. This fluid is backward compatible with all Type "A" Suffix "A", and the Type "A" fluids produced from 1949 to 1966.

This fluid was first used in the following transmissions:
 1969 GM Hydra-Matic 180 3-Speed Automatic Transmission

1973 – DEXRON-II(C)
The original Dexron (B) fluid, as well as earlier GM transmission fluids, used sperm whale oil as an additive to coat internal transmission parts to prevent corrosion and rust. The U.S. Endangered Species Act banned the import of sperm whale oil, so the Dexron (B) fluid additive package had to be reformulated. In 1973, GM introduced Dexron-II(C) (GM Spec GM6032M).

Dexron-II(C) was composed of a more stable, less reactive, hydrocracked Group 2 base oil plus a revised additive package with corrosion and rust inhibitors such as Jojoba oil; however, the additive package caused problems with corrosion-prone solder in a relatively small number of GM's transmission fluid coolers. After discovering the corrosion problem, GM updated the fluid specification again and released Dexron-II(D) in 1975.

GM Dexron-II(C) licensed products have a license number on the container that begins with the letter C. Example: C-20109. This was the first GM ATF to advertise 50,000 miles between changes. This fluid is backward compatible with all previous Dexron fluids as well as the Type "A" Suffix "A", and the Type "A" fluids produced from 1949 to 1966.

1975 – DEXRON-II(D)
In 1975, GM released the Dexron-II(D) specification (GM6032M). Dexron-II(D) was composed of Group 2 base oil plus an additive package with alternative corrosion and rust inhibitors. The revised corrosion and rust inhibitors made the new fluid hygroscopic, which, while it was not a major problem in automatic transmissions, made Dexron II(D) unsuitable for other hydraulic systems in which it was commonly used. GM Dexron-II(D) licensed products have a license number on the container that begins with the letter D. Example: D-20002. This fluid is backward compatible with all previous Dexron fluids as well as the Type "A" Suffix "A", and the Type "A" fluids produced from 1949 to 1966.

As a result of the 1973 OPEC Oil Embargo and fuel shortages, the U.S. government created the Corporate Average Fuel Economy (CAFE) regulations in 1975. The regulations were to be fully implemented by the 1978 model year. The automotive industry responded by changing to three typically unused transmission technologies:
 A 4th gear (overdrive)
 A Torque Converter Clutch (TCC)
 Front Wheel Drive (FWD)

The 1978 introduction of the TCC led to customer complaints of a shudder while driving. All vehicle manufacturers made changes to their ATF specifications and the controls of their TCC to try to alleviate the problem. GM released a revision to the Dexron-II(D) fluid specification in 1978, Chrysler released the ATF+2 fluid specification (MS-7176D) in 1980, and Ford released the Mercon Type "H' fluid specification (M2C166-H) in 1981.

This fluid was first used in the following transmissions:
 1976 GM Hydra-Matic 200 3-Speed Automatic Transmission
 1976 GM Hydra-Matic 250 3-Speed Automatic Transmission
 1978 GM Hydra-Matic 325 3-Speed Transaxle w/TCC
 1979 GM Hydra-Matic 125 3-Speed Transaxle w/TCC
 1982 GM Hydra-Matic 200-4R 4-Speed Transmission w/TCC
 1983 GM Hydra-Matic 700-R4 4-Speed Transmission w/TCC
 1984 GM Hydra-Matic 440-T4 4-Speed Transaxle w/TCC

The equivalent on ELF is RenaultMatic D2.

1990 – DEXRON-II(E)
In the 1990s, electronic controls of the transmission phased out the old hydraulic/mechanically controlled system, GM was first to market with Cadillac Allante's electronic controlled transmission system THM F-7 in 1987, followed by Chrysler and Toyota in 1988 and Ford in 1989.

Electronic control of shift pattern (when does it shift), shift timing (how long it takes to shift), shift quality (shift feel), line pressure, and TCC apply and release rates were all affected by cold temperature performance of the ATF flowing through solenoids.

In 1990, Dexron-II(E) (GM Spec GM6137M) was released. Dexron-II(E) was composed of Group 2 base oil plus an additive package. According to the GM Technical Service Bulletin: 92-7-2 issued Oct-2-1991, DEXRON-II(E) has better anti-foaming characteristics, improved low-temperature flow characteristics (low-temperature viscosity), and improved high-temperature oxidation stability. This fluid's low temperature performance was also improved (20,000cP @ -40C vs 50,000cP@-40C).

GM Dexron-II(E) licensed products have a license number on the container that begins with the letter E. Example: E20001. This fluid is backward compatible with all previous Dexron fluids as well as the Type "A" Suffix "A", and the Type "A" fluids produced from 1949 to 1966.

This fluid was first used in the following transmissions:
 1991 GM Hydra-Matic 4L80-E (GM's first mass-produced, electronically controlled transmission)

The Dexron-II(E) fluid specification was revised in August 1992. This fluid was first used in the following transmissions:
 1993 GM Hydra-Matic 4L60-E 4-Speed, electronically controlled transmission.
 1993 GM Hydra-Matic 4T60-E 4-Speed, electronically controlled transaxle.

1993 – DEXRON-III(F)
In 1993, GM released the new Dexron-III (F) fluid (GM Spec GM6417M and later GMN10055). Dexron-III(F) was composed of Group 2+ base oil plus an additive package. According to GM TSB 57-02-01 issued Oct-2-1992. The improvements in Dexron-III(F) include better friction stability, more high-temperature oxidation stability, and better material compatibility. Dexron-III(F) has the same low-temperature fluidity as Dexron-II(E), for better transmission performance in cold weather. This specification failed to address a number of issues concerning long term durabilities such as shear stability and fluid oxidation.

Dexron-III(F) underwent a number of iterations in an attempt to address various shortcomings but was eventually replaced by new thinking i.e. DEXRON-VI(J). GM Dexron-III(F) licensed products have a license number on the can that begins with the letter F. Example: F-30001. This fluid is backward compatible with all previous Dexron fluids as well as the Type "A" Suffix "A", and the Type "A" fluids produced from 1949 to 1966.

In 1994–1995, some early OBD-II phase-in vehicles experienced a P0300 DTC (Random Misfire). Engineers determined that road forces being transferred through the TCC were affecting the normal rotational fluctuations of the crankshaft and tricked the ECM into thinking there was a cylinder misfire.

The solution was to create a new kind of TCC that would normally slip around 35 rpm. GM called it the Variable Capacity Converter Clutch (VCCC), other manufacturers had their own names. Some VCCC systems had a shudder or vibration during normal operation. Engineers tried several computer calibration changes, but a revised fluid was also needed to address the issue.

Ford released the new Mercon V Fluid Specification in 1996, GM released the Dexron-III (G) Fluid Specification (GM6417M) in 1998, and Chrysler released the MS-9602 Change C Fluid Specification in 1999.

This fluid was first used in the following transmissions:
 1997 GM Hydra-Matic 4T65-E 4-Speed transaxle with Variable Capacity Converter Clutch (VCCC).

1998 – DEXRON III(G)
Released in December 1998, GM's Dexron-III(G) specification (GM6417M) was a synthetic blend automatic transmission fluid, especially developed to address the VCCC shuddering issue. It is also suitable for power steering systems, some hydraulic systems and for rotary air compressors where an excellent low-temperature fluidity is required.

GM Dexron-III(G) licensed products have a license number on the can that begins with the letter G. Example: G-30001. This fluid is backward compatible with all previous Dexron fluids as well as the Type "A" Suffix "A", and the Type "A" fluids produced from 1949 to 1966.

2003 – DEXRON III(H)

Introduced in 2003, GM's Dexron III(H) specification (GMN10055) replaced III (G). The (H) is an additive package for an updated friction modifier and with an oxidatively stable base oil (group 2). Oils according to this specification have longer maintenance of friction properties and anti-shudder properties, better foam control and a longer fluid life. Universal for all automatic transmission with and without controlled torque converter lockup clutch, the so-called GKÜB for gear-clutch-lock.

GM Dexron-III(H) licensed products prior to 2011 had a license number on the can that begins with the letter H. Example: H-30001.

NOTICE: This fluid specification and licensing program was inactivated in March 2011. The ATF Type III(H) fluid shown in the photograph is ACDelco's non-licensed fluid which is used to support older transmissions which still required the Dexron-III(H) fluid. This fluid is backward compatible with all previous Dexron fluids as well as the Type "A" Suffix "A", and the Type "A" fluids produced from 1949 to 1966.
 
Notice 2: The fluid on ELF is FluidMatic D3

2005 – DEXRON-VI(J)
In a joint venture, Ford and GM collaborated on the development of a new 6-speed FWD transaxle (6T70/6F50). Both companies would share the designs and build their own transmissions. The design of these transmissions required a new fluid.

In 2005, Ford released the Mercon Low Viscosity (LV) fluid and GM released the Dexron VI specification. The fluid specification for Dexron-VI (J) was first used as the GM factory-fill automatic transmission fluid for the model year 2006. Roy Fewkes, GM Powertrain Staff Project Engineer and Chairman of the GM
ATF/Driveline Lubricants Approval Committee patented the new Dexron-VI (J) fluid composition under US Patent US8642519B2

Dexron VI is of a slightly lower viscosity when new compared to the prior Dexron fluids (a maximum of 6.4 cSt at 100 °C for Dexron VI and 7.5 cSt for Dexron III), but the allowed viscosity loss from shearing of the ATF during use is lower for Dexron VI, resulting in the same lowest allowed final viscosity for both Dexron III and VI (5.5 cSt) in test.  In reality most of the DEXRON-III fluids typically sheared to about 4.2 cSt in use. The lower, more stable viscosity improved pumping efficiency within the transmission and fluid stability over life. Since Dexron VI is not allowed to thin out (lower its viscosity) as much as Dexron III during use, it requires the use of higher-quality, more shear-stable (less prone to thinning while in use) formulations. The container rear label reads "Full Synthetic Automatic Transmission Fluid"; however, the base oil composition is not stated. The current GM specification that defines the fluid is GMW16444, which superseded the original specification, GMN10060.

All Dexron-III (H) licenses expired permanently at the end of 2011, and GM now supports only Dexron-VI fluids for use in their older automatic transmissions. Aftermarket fluids asserted by their manufacturers to meet Dexron-III(H) and earlier standards continue to be sold under names such as Dex/Merc. These fluids are not regulated or endorsed by GM.

GM Dexron-VI(J) licensed products have a license number on the container that begins with the letter J. Example: J-60301. This was the first GM ATF to advertise 100,000 miles (160,000 km) between changes for "Normal Driving" conditions and 50,000 miles (80,000 km) for "Severe Service". This fluid is backward compatible with Dexron-III(H) and Dexron-III(G) fluids only.

This fluid was first used in the following transmissions:
 2007 6T70/6T75 Transaxles
 2007 6L80 Transmission

The fluid on ELF is FluidMatic G6 SYN.

2013 – DEXRON-HP
With increasing CAFE regulations, smaller engines with very narrow torque bands were being put in vehicles with 6- and 8-speed transmissions to improve fuel economy. A new fluid revision was needed for the proper operation of the new 2015 GM 8L90 and 8L45 8-Speed RWD/4WD automatic transmissions. This was GM's first "Lifetime" fluid with no fluid or filter changes required under "Normal" driving conditions. The current GM specification that defines the fluid is GMW16974.

There have been two versions of this fluid specification
 In July 2013, GM released the Low Viscosity (LV) Dexron-HP (High Performance) Fluid Specification. As shown on the photograph of the rear panel, the 2013 Dexron HP is composed of a group 4 Polyalphaolefin (PAO) Base oil and additives provided by the Afton Chemical Corporation. The rear panel label of early containers of this fluid incorrectly state that this fluid is backward compatible with previous Dexron ATF, it is not. The label was corrected on later bottles of the fluid.
 In May 2017, A revision was made to the GMW16974 fluid specification. A change to a Group III+ base oil rather than a group 4 PAO base oil was made as well as another additive package option from Afton Chemical Corporation.

GM Dexron-HP licensed products have a license number on the container that begins with the letter J. Example: J-60168.

This fluid was first used in the following transmissions:
 2015 8L90, 8L45, 8-speed RWD/4WD vehicles
 2017 1ET25 Chevrolet Bolt EV drive unit
 2018 9T50 9-Speed FWD/AWD transaxle

2014 – DEXRON-ULV
The fluid specification for Dexron-ULV (Ultra-Low Viscosity) was introduced January 2, 2014. Dexron ULV is composed of a Group 3+ Base oil and additives needed for the proper operation of the 2017 and above GM 10L90 and the Ford 10R80 10-Speed rear wheel drive automatic transmission.

This transmission and the transmission fluid specification was co-developed by Ford and GM. The current specification that defines the fluid is FORD WSS-M2C949-A. This fluid is also marketed as Mercon ULV.

IMPORTANT: The quart containers of Dexron ULV must be shaken to stir up the additives before pouring. This fluid is not backward compatible with any previous fluids.

This fluid was first used in the following transmissions:
 2017 10L90 10-Speed Automatic Transmission

2016 – Mobil 1 Synthetic LV ATF HP "Black Label"
in 2016, a new fluid specification for a "Dexron Approved" Mobil 1 Synthetic LV ATF HP was introduced in a GM Technical Service Bulletin 16-NA-175. The revision was to help correct a torque converter clutch shudder in the GM 8L90, 8L80, and 8L45 automatic transmissions.

Dexron LV ATF HP is made by Mobil and is marketed as Mobil 1 LV ATF HP. Dexron LV ATF HP is composed of a Poly-alpha-olefin (PAO) Group IV Base oil and additives developed by Afton Chemical needed for the proper operation of the 2015 and above GM 8L90 8-Speed rear wheel drive automatic transmission. The current GM specification that defines the fluid is GMW16974 (2nd Edition, May 2017).

2016 – DEXRON III(K) for Manual Transmissions
On August 1, 2016, GM released the Dexron III (K) fluid specification (GM Spec GMW17639) as a fluid to support older GM manual transmissions and power steering systems requiring the previously discontinued Dexron-III(H) fluid.

WARNING:The additive package for automatic transmissions has been removed from this fluid; do not use it in any automatic transmission.

2018 – Mobil 1 Synthetic LV ATF HP "Blue Label"
On October 1, 2018, a special fluid specification (GMNA-9986555) was introduced for a revised "Dexron Approved" Mobil 1 Synthetic LV ATF HP. This revised fluid was introduced in GM Technical Service Bulletin 18-NA-355 in December 2018. The revision is to help correct a torque converter clutch shudder in the GM 8L90 and 8L45 automatic transmissions after a complete flush of the system.

Dexron LV ATF LV is made by Mobil and is marketed as Mobil-1 LV ATF HP. Mobil-1 LV ATF HP is composed of a  Gas to liquids (GTL) Group 3+ Base oil and additives developed by  Infineum needed for the proper operation of the 2015 and above GM 8L90 and 8L45 8-Speed rear wheel drive automatic transmission.

IMPORTANT: Containers of this fluid have a revised blue and silver label on the front of the container. This "Dexron Approved" Dexron HP product has a J-62120 license number on the rear label of the container.

GM "Lifetime" ATF

Example maintenance schedule

GM Lifetime automatic transmission fluids made from higher quality base oil and an additive package are more chemically stable, less reactive, and do not experience oxidation as easily as lower quality fluids made from lower quality base oil and an additive package. Therefore, higher quality transmission fluids can last a long time in normal driving conditions (Typically 100,000 miles (160,934 km) or more).

The definition of 'Lifetime Fluid" differs from transmission manufacturer to transmission manufacturer. Always consult the vehicle maintenance guide for the proper service interval for the fluid in your transmission and your driving conditions.

Chevrolet Colorado Example: According to the Scheduled Maintenance Guide of a 2018 Chevrolet Colorado with "Lifetime Fluid" could have two different fluid service intervals depending upon how the vehicle is driven:

1. Normal Driving
 Carry passengers and cargo within recommended limits on the Tire and Loading Information label
 Driven on reasonable road surfaces within legal driving limits. 
Under "Normal" driving conditions, the automatic transmission fluid and filter never needs to be changed.

2. Severe Driving
 Mainly driven in heavy city traffic in hot weather
 Mainly driven in hilly or mountainous terrain
 Frequently towing a trailer
 Used for high speed or competitive driving
 Used for taxi, police, or delivery service. 
Under "Severe" driving conditions, replace automatic transmission fluid and filter every 45,000 mi (72,420 km)

See also
 Mercon ATM

References

External links

Official website (archived)
GM Rolls Out Dexron VI (archived)
GM Launches More Fuel-Saving Six-Speed Automatic Transmissions (archived)
 A Look at Changes in Automatic Transmission Fluid
80 Years of GM Automatic Transmission Fluid - ATF History Part 2 
Changing Gears: The Development of the Automotive Transmission
GM Service Information Subscription Access

General Motors transmissions
Hydraulic fluids
Automotive chemicals
Automobile transmissions
Petroleum based lubricants